A joke is a humorous question, short story or quip.

Joke(s) or The Joke may also refer to:

 Joke (given name), also Jokes

Music
 Joke (rapper), a French rapper
 "The Joke" (string quartet), nickname of Op. 33 No. 2 String Quartet by Joseph Haydn
 "The Joke" (song), a 2017 song by Brandi Carlile
 "Joke", a 2015 song by Chastity Belt from Time to Go Home
 "The Joke", a 1995 song by The Fall from Cerebral Caustic
 "The Joke", a 1991 song by Human Resource
 "The Joke", a 2007 song by Lifehouse from Who We Are

Other media
 "Joke" (sketch), a comedy sketch by Rowan Atkinson and Richard Curtis
 The Joke (novel), a 1967 novel by Milan Kundera
 The Joke (film), a 1969 film based on the Kundera novel
 Jokes, an unfinished 2000 film by Harmony Korine

See also
 Joker (disambiguation)
 "Jokester", a science fiction short story by Isaac Asimov